Andersonville is a 1996 American television film directed by John Frankenheimer about a group of Union soldiers during the American Civil War who are captured by the Confederates and sent to an infamous Confederate prison camp.

The film is loosely based on the diary of John Ransom, a Union soldier imprisoned there. Although certain points of the plot are fabricated, the general conditions of the camp accurately match Ransom's descriptions, particularly references to the administration of the camp by Captain Henry Wirz. His line on escaping prisoners is very similar to the book, "The Flying Dutchman [Wirz] offers to give two at a time twelve hours the start".

Plot
The film begins with a group of Union soldiers being captured and forced to surrender at Cold Harbor, Virginia, in June 1864. They are transported to prisoner-of-war Camp Sumter, near Andersonville, Georgia. When they enter, they discover a former comrade, named Dick Potter, who was captured at Antietam, who explains the grim realities of life in the camp – primarily the lack of shelter, clean water, and regular food supplies. He also states the danger of a prison gang of fellow Union POWs, called the "Raiders", who hoard the camp's meager rations, and lure unsuspecting "fresh fish" – newly captured soldiers – into their area of the camp, to attack and rob them.

With every able-bodied man required for fighting, young teenagers and old men are used as guards. At one watch tower, manned by two young guards, a Union soldier offers money for some corn. He is instructed to step over the "dead line" fence and approach the watch tower to trade, which contradicts the rules of the camp. But reluctantly, compelled by starvation, the soldier steps over the line, and (in a macabre type of game) the Confederate soldiers in the next watch tower shoot him dead.

As the story unfolds, the unit captured at the beginning of the film ally with some inmates, and help them by working on their tunnel under the stockade wall. Eventually it is complete, but one man tries to inform the guards, in hope of receiving a reward. He is captured and "TT" (meaning tunnel traitor) is cut into his forehead as a warning. The escape is attempted one night, and all goes well until the last man is spotted and shot, and the dogs are unleashed. In a very short time, most escapees are back in the camp and placed in standing stocks as punishment.

The situation with the Raiders eventually becomes unbearable, as group after group of new prisoners are targeted upon arrival. Night raids are made, with possessions being taken from tents and prisoners injured or killed by the Raiders. After a banjo is stolen, one man fights to get it back but is badly beaten. Things progressively get worse until finally one man decides he has seen enough of the "vultures out to rob and murder the new boys". He rallies support from the disparate groups, and within minutes hundreds of his comrades are charging the Raiders' camp. A massive and deadly riot ensues.

In the end the Raiders are beaten, stolen goods are redistributed to their owners, but many want them all hanged outright. But upon the insistence of a few, a request for a legitimate court-martial is made to Captain Henry Wirz, the Confederate commandant of the prison camp. A trial is held, with a jury made up of new internees, which ultimately results in the six ring-leaders being found guilty and sentenced to death by hanging. After the executions life becomes relatively peaceful, but the cold reality of starvation, and lack of sanitation or medical care, begins to set in as emaciation, dysentery, scurvy, and fever take their toll, causing many to die. As the film ends, an announcement is made by Captain Wirz that all prisoners are to be exchanged – the surviving Federal soldiers leave the camp, filing past their dead comrades on the way to the trains.

Against a view of the present-day Andersonville National Cemetery, the movie's end coda reads:
In 1864–5, more than 45,000 Union soldiers were imprisoned in Andersonville. 12,912 died there. The prisoner exchange never happened. The men who walked to the trains were taken to other prisons, where they remained until the war ended. After the war, Wirz was hanged, the only soldier to be tried and executed for war crimes committed during the Civil War.

Cast

 Jarrod Emick as Josiah Day
 Frederic Forrest as Sgt. McSpadden
 Ted Marcoux as Martin Blackburn
 Carmen Argenziano as Hopkins
 Jayce Bartok as Billy
 Frederick Coffin as Collins
 Cliff DeYoung as Sgt. John Gleason
 Denis Forest as Mad Matthew
 Justin Henry as Tyce
 Tony Higgins as Tucker
 Andrew Kavovit as Tobias
 Olek Krupa as Olek Wisnovsky
 William H. Macy as Col. Chandler
 Matt McGrath as Ethan
 Peter Murnik as Limber Jim
 Gabriel Olds as Bob Reese
 William Sanderson as Munn
 Gregory Sporleder as Dick Potter
 Jan Tříska as Capt. Henry Wirz
 Bruce Evers as Lt. Barrett
 Robert David Hall as Samson
 Thomas F. Wilson as Thomas Sweet

Production
The mini series was a pet project of mogul Ted Turner, an American Civil War enthusiast who wanted to bring to the screen a series of historically accurate films about the conflict. After the critical acclaim and financial success of his previous production Gettysburg in 1993, he would go on to produce its prequel Gods and Generals in 2003. All were massive productions on huge scales.

Andersonville was filmed on location on a farm some fifty miles south of Atlanta (about a hundred miles north of the actual location of the camp) where a huge set was built (not quite to scale) of the actual camp. Accurate in detail down to the officer's quarters outside the camp gates, the fifty foot high raw timber walls and thousands of ragged tents, a working stream, and even a full scale railway depot with half of a locomotive made of wood were built on the property. At any given time there were hundreds of extras employed every day, many of whom were Civil War reenactors who came from all over the nation to take part in the production. Their deep devotion to the subject matter and attention to detail gave the film much of its authenticity. Many of the extras were also college students, both men and women brought in by the busload for the larger scenes. At its height more than four thousand extras a day were employed, making it necessary to have an ultra early call time of three a.m. for a general set call of seven. Dozens of additional makeup, hair, wardrobe and production staff were needed for these scenes, which actually went very well due to military style organization with the "troops" even being marched in platoons from the preparation tents to the set.

Shot in the early to late fall of 1994, it was a typical southern season of change with the weather proving difficult at best. With temperatures swinging between extremely hot to cold and rainy, the heavy red clay that makes up Georgia soil would turn into a sludge up to three feet deep during rains and would solidify to rock hard status a day later when temperatures soared. Long days took their toll on the cast and crew and the situation came to a head when disaster struck at the end of principal photography. 
 
The critical scenes involving the trials and hanging of the raiders were shot over two days with the raw film being shipped out to Los Angeles labs every few days. The crate containing this film was lost in transit by the shipping company and though there was tremendous effort to find it the film was never located. Shooting had just wrapped with sets being torn down and the farm location restored. This necessitated a partial re-building of the set on location in North Carolina and a gathering of all the principal actors involved in the scenes for a very costly re-shoot which took about a week to complete.

Release

Critical reception
Caryn James of The New York Times gave a critical review of the film. She described the movie's central characters, especially the Raiders, as clichéd and underdeveloped. James faulted many elements of the plot as being similar to events in other prison movies. She said that the film improved as it went on, but not enough to redeem it, adding: "Scene for scene, Mr. Frankenheimer knows how to build tension, even when it fails to lead anywhere surprising."

Howard Rosenberg of The Los Angeles Times praised the film for its opening sequences, visual effects, and historical accuracy. However, he took issue with its pacing in addition to what he believed to be a lack of suspense, and like James noted similarities to previous films. Rosenberg said that, while the central cast performed "ably," none of the characters stood out well enough from each other to allow the audience to root "for an individual instead of for a tormented blur."

Awards
The program won a 1996 Emmy for Outstanding Individual Achievement in Directing for a Miniseries or a Special for director John Frankenheimer. It was nominated in six other categories as well, including a nomination for cinematographer, Ric Waite.

References

External links

1996 television films
1996 films
TNT Network original films
American television films
American Civil War films
Films directed by John Frankenheimer
Films scored by Gary Chang
Films set in 1864
Films set in Georgia (U.S. state)
Films set in Richmond, Virginia
Films set in Virginia
Films shot in Georgia (U.S. state)
Films shot in North Carolina
Primetime Emmy Award-winning television series
Films based on diaries
Prisoner of war films
1990s American films